Feng Ting-kuo (24 September 1950 – 5 June 2018) was a Taiwanese politician. He served on the Taipei City Council from 1985 to 1988, and was a member of the National Assembly between 1992 and 1996, then represented Taichung County in the Legislative Yuan until 2008.

Education
Feng obtained a bachelor's degree in law from Chinese Culture University before earning a master's degree in computer science from the State University of New York and a doctorate in education at the University of Denver.

Political career
Feng was first elected to the Taipei City Council and later sat on the National Assembly. He was a New Party candidate for Taichung County in the 1995 legislative elections and won. Feng was reelected in 1998, and switched political affiliations to the People First Party in April 2001, eight months before a second successful reelection bid. Feng supported a 2004 proposal for the People First Party to merge with the Kuomintang, though plans fell through. He backed efforts to simplify the process foreign nationals married to native Taiwanese had to go through to obtain a work permit. The People First Party suggested Feng fill a vacancy on the Control Yuan in 2007, but he did not receive an official nomination. Later that year, Feng suspended his legislative campaign in favor of Kuomintang candidate Chiang Lien-fu.

Misjudgements
Feng was charged with bribery in 2008, for accepting a sum of money traced to the National Chinese Herbal Apothecary Association in 1998. The Taipei District Court acquitted Feng in January 2009, but the ruling was overturned by the Taiwan High Court in September 2010, which sentenced Feng to seven years and two months imprisonment. The Taiwan High Court ruled in September 2017 that Feng was not guilty, and his sentence was revoked.

The Taiwan High Court ruled on a separate case involving Feng in 2012, finding him not guilty of breaching the Assembly and Parade Act in a March 2004 protest of presidential election results.

Death 
In the early morning of 5 June 2018, Feng died of myocardial infarction at the age of 67.

References

1950 births
2018 deaths
Taichung Members of the Legislative Yuan
Members of the 3rd Legislative Yuan
Members of the 4th Legislative Yuan
Members of the 5th Legislative Yuan
Members of the 6th Legislative Yuan
Chinese Culture University alumni
State University of New York alumni
University of Denver alumni
People First Party Members of the Legislative Yuan
New Party Members of the Legislative Yuan
Taiwanese politicians convicted of bribery
Taipei City Councilors
Leaders of the New Party (Taiwan)